Joseph E. Garland (September 30, 1922 - August 30, 2011) was an American historian and journalist who wrote extensively about the city of Gloucester, Massachusetts and its fishing industry.

Biography

Garland was born in Brookline, Massachusetts in 1922 to a prominent Boston area family. Garland's degree at Harvard University was interrupted by service in the United States Army in 1943. Following the war, he worked as a reporter for the Minneapolis Tribune, Providence Journal, and Boston Herald, before settling on Eastern Point, in Gloucester, Massachusetts in the home of his great grandfather Joseph Garland (mayor). While living in Gloucester Garland was an involved community member, notably acting as the first president of the restoration project of the Adventure (1926 schooner). 

Garland was married two times, first to Rebecca Choate, and later to Helen Bryan Garland

Notable Published Works
 
Lone Voyager (A biography of Howard Blackburn) 
Gloucester On the Wind
Guns Off Gloucester
Down to the Sea 
Unknown Soldiers: Reliving World War 
The Gloucester Guide
Bear of the Sea: Giant Jim Pattillo
The Fish and the Falcon: Gloucester's Resolute Role in America's Fight for Freedom 
Beating to Windward (Collection of Columns published in the Gloucester Daily Times)
Boston's Gold Coast: The North Shore

References 

American historians

American journalists
Gloucester, Massachusetts
1922 births
2011 deaths
Harvard University alumni
United States Army personnel of World War II